Roger Federer defeated Tomáš Berdych in the final, 3–6, 6–4, 6–3 to win the men's singles tennis title at the 2014 Dubai Tennis Championships. It was his record sixth Dubai title.

Novak Djokovic was the defending champion, but lost to Federer in the semifinals.

Seeds

Draw

Finals

Top half

Bottom half

Qualifying

Seeds

Qualifiers

Qualifying draw

First qualifier

Second qualifier

Third qualifier

Fourth qualifier

References
 Main Draw
 Qualifying Draw

Dubai Tennis Championships - Men's Singles
2014 Dubai Tennis Championships